Kulli may refer to:

Kulli culture, prehistoric culture in southern Balochistan, Pakistan ca. 2500 - 2000 BCE

Places in Estonia
Kulli, Harju County, village in Raasiku Parish, Harju County
Kulli, Pärnu County, village in Varbla Parish, Pärnu County
Kulli, Tartu County, village in Rannu Parish, Tartu County
Kulli, Valga County, village in Hummuli Parish, Valga County
Kärla-Kulli, village in Lääne-Saare Parish, Saare County, formerly known as Kulli
Lümanda-Kulli, village in Lääne-Saare Parish, Saare County, formerly known as Kulli

Other places
Kulli, Iran, a village in East Azerbaijan Province, Iran